Kumander Dante is a 1988 Filipino biographical action film about the co-founder of the New People's Army, the militant arm of the Communist Party of the Philippines, Bernabe "Kumander Dante" Buscayno. Produced and directed by Ben "M7" Yalung from a screenplay by Ricky Lee, the film stars Phillip Salvador as the titular rebel, alongside Laarni Enriquez, Paquito Diaz, Charlie Davao, Robert Talabis, Bing Davao, Bomber Moran, King Gutierrez, E. R. Ejercito, and Ruben Rustia; Buscayno himself provides the narration. The film was produced by Cine Suerte and was released on September 1, 1988.

Critic Lav Diaz gave Kumander Dante a positive review. It was nominated for five FAMAS Awards, for Best Action Picture, Best Supporting Actor (Diaz), Best Cinematography, Best Music and Best Art Direction, but it did not win in any category.

Cast
Phillip Salvador as Bernabe Buscayno / Kumander Dante
Laarni Enriquez
Paquito Diaz
Charlie Davao
Robert Talabis
Bing Davao
Bomber Moran
King Gutierrez
E. R. Ejercito
Ruben Rustia
Lucita Soriano
Ernie Zarate
Mario Escudero
Joel Lamangan
Zandro Zamora as Kumander Alibasbas
Mon Godiz as Ka Amado
Franco Mateo as Victor Corpuz
Ramon Reyes as Ninoy Aquino
Luis Gonzales as Ferdinand Marcos

Production
It is actor Luis Gonzales' third portrayal of Ferdinand Marcos, after the films Iginuhit ng Tadhana in 1965 and Pinagbuklod ng Langit in 1969.

Bernabe Buscayno stated in an August 1988 interview on the television program Public Forum that "40% of the film is not true", sharing that director Ben Yalung had altered certain portions of Ricky Lee's screenplay involving action sequences such as by adding the fictional scene of Buscayno disguising himself as a woman in a Volkswagen, to which Buscayno said that he only used a kalesa when he needed to be brought to a hospital for treatment. He also revealed that he had previously intended to delay the film's release in order to correct the inaccuracies, but decided against it due to the lengthy and expensive process of filing a complaint.

Phillip Salvador, who portrayed Buscayno in the film, also stated that they had to add scenes "for cinematic purposes" in order for the studio to make a profit at the box office and recoup the large budget it provided for the film.

Release
Kumander Dante was graded "A" by the Movie and Television Review and Classification Board (MTRCB), indicating a "Very Good" quality, and was released in theaters on September 1, 1988.

Critical response
Lav Diaz, writing for the Manila Standard, gave the film a positive review. Though he criticized the filmmakers' decision to not heed Bernabe Buscayno's qualms about inaccuracies and exaggerated action scenes in the film ("even if [director] Yalung's over-exaggeration of fight scenes is removed, the life of Dante would still reach Lam-Ang proportions"), he still commended Yalung's direction, Ricky Lee's screenplay, and the film's shot-on-location scenes.

Accolades

References

External links

1988 films
1980s action drama films
1988 action films
Cultural depictions of Benigno Aquino Jr.
Cultural depictions of Ferdinand Marcos
Filipino-language films
Films about communism
Films about rebels
Films set in the 1970s
Philippine action films
Philippine biographical films